Oreophryne, the cross frogs, is a genus of microhylid frogs endemic to Southern Philippine, Celebes and the Lesser Sunda Islands, and New Guinea.

Species

References

External links
 . 2013. Amphibian Species of the World: an Online Reference. Version 5.6 (9 January 2013). Oreophryne. Electronic Database accessible at  American Museum of Natural History, New York, USA. (Accessed: November 23, 2013).
  [web application]. 2008. Berkeley, California: Oreophryne. AmphibiaWeb, available at https://web.archive.org/web/20040827082534/http://www.amphibiaweb.org/ (Accessed: June 14, 2008).
  taxon Oreophryne at http://www.eol.org.
  Taxon Oreophryne at https://web.archive.org/web/20160606043808/http://www.itis.gov/index.html. (Accessed: June 14, 2008).

 
Microhylidae
Amphibian genera
Taxa named by Oskar Boettger